Wolf and Sheep is the second studio album by South Korean boy group H.O.T., released through SM Entertainment on July 5, 1997. The album spawned three singles that were promoted with music videos and live performances on music programs: "Wolf and Sheep", "Full of Happiness", and "We Are the Future". 

The album was a commercial success in South Korea, where it sold one million copies in ten days. By the end of 1998, it had sold more than 1.5 million copies and became one of the best-selling albums in the country. H.O.T. won several awards with Wolf and Sheep, including Album Daesang at the annual Golden Disc Awards and the Grand Prize (daesang) at the Seoul Music Awards.

Background 
Wolf and Sheep was released as H.O.T.'s second studio album on July 5, 1997, and served as a follow-up to the success of their debut album We Hate All Kinds of Violence from the previous year. Upon the album's release, however, the single "Wolf and Sheep" was judged unfit for broadcast in South Korea due to some of its lyrical content.

In September 1997, H.O.T.'s first fan club inauguration ceremony was held as part of album-related promotional activities. In January 1998, the group held a solo concert tour in South Korea before embarking on a tour in the United States the following month. It made stops in New York City, Washington D.C., Honolulu and Los Angeles.

Reception 
In a February 2013 review of the album, critic Wei Su-ji of webzine IZM complimented the record's composition and felt that the song's were more refined as compared with those from the group's previous effort. Wei highlighted "Wolf and Sheep" and "Full of Happiness" as musical parallels to "Warrior's Descendant" and "Candy", with each track representing a "strong man" and a "lively boy" persona that teenage boys can possess. She additionally complimented the melodies and lyrics of the ballad tracks "Free to Fly" and "You & I", saying that they "are not outdated even by today's standards after 15 years." Commercially, the album was a big success in South Korea. Within ten days, Wolf and Sheep recorded sales of over 1 million units. By the end of the following year, it sold more than 1.5 million copies in the country.

South Korean concert tour

98 H.O.T. 1st Concert

Accolades

Tracklist

The first six seconds of the song "We are the future" were used in the Russian TV game "Own Game" (Jeopardy!) in 2001-2013, when the TV game hosts announced the categories in each round.

Release history

See also
 List of best-selling albums in South Korea

References 

1997 albums
SM Entertainment albums
H.O.T. albums